Michael "Michi" Beck (born 11 December 1967), also known by his pseudonym as the disc jockey Dee Jot Hausmarke, is a member of the German hip hop group Die Fantastischen Vier where he acts as DJ and MC. He also forms the duo Turntablerocker, with Thomas Burchia.

Solo career
Beck produced his first solo album Weltweit ("Worldwide") with Thomilla in the Benztown Studios Stuttgart in 1998. The album features German rappers like Afrob, Max Herre and MC Rene alongside international artists, most notably Wyclef Jean, Melle Mel and Scorpio. Three singles from Weltweit were released: "Mädchen No 1", "Turntablerocker (Beweg Deinen Popo)" featuring Max Herre and "Für immer", featuring Yvette Michelle.

References

External links

 Discography at Discogs

1967 births
Living people
German rappers
German DJs
Musicians from Stuttgart
Die Fantastischen Vier

Electronic dance music DJs